The 1988 Virginia Slims of Indianapolis was a women's tennis tournament played on outdoor hard courts in Indianapolis, Indiana in the United States and was part of the Category 2 tier of the 1988 WTA Tour. It was the ninth edition of the tournament and ran from October 24 through October 30, 1988. Second-seeded Katerina Maleeva won the singles title and earned $17,000 first-prize money.

Finals

Singles

 Katerina Maleeva defeated  Zina Garrison 6–3, 2–6, 6–2
 It was Maleeva's only title of the year and the 6th of her career.

Doubles

 Larisa Savchenko /  Natasha Zvereva defeated  Katrina Adams /  Zina Garrison 6–2, 6–1
 It was Savchenko's 2nd title of the year and the 10th of her career. It was Zvereva's 2nd title of the year and the 2nd of her career.

References

External links
 ITF tournament edition details
 Tournament draws

1988 WTA Tour
1988
1988 in sports in Indiana
1988 in American tennis
October 1988 sports events in the United States